Szczawinskia leucopoda is a species of lichen belonging to the family Pilocarpaceae. 

Native to Norway, it was described as a new species in 2002 by lichenologists Håkon Holien and Tor Tønsberg.

References

Pilocarpaceae
Lichen species
Lichens described in 2002
Lichens of Europe